The 1988 Hamilton Tiger-Cats season was the 31st season for the team in the Canadian Football League and their 39th overall. The Tiger-Cats finished in 3rd place in the East Division with a 9–9 record and lost the East Semi-Final to the Winnipeg Blue Bombers. Earl Winfield tied Steve Stapler's record for most touchdowns in one season with 13 (which Tony Champion broke the year later). It would be Stapler's final season with the Tiger-Cats, and he finished ranked fourth all-time in franchise history in touchdowns. Paul Osbaldiston would set a franchise record (which he would break on three separate occasions) for the most converts in one season with 49 made.

Preseason

Regular season

Season standings

Season schedule

Postseason

Schedule

Awards and honours
Ralph Sazio was elected into the Canadian Football Hall of Fame as a Builder on March 5, 1988.
CFL's Most Outstanding Defensive Player Award – Grover Covington (DE)

1988 CFL All-Stars
DE – Grover Covington
DB – Howard Fields
DT – Mike Walker
ST – Earl Winfield

References

Hamilton Tiger-Cats seasons
Hamilton Tiger-Cats
Hamilton Tiger-Cats